The Catholic Bishops' Conference of Nigeria is the Catholic episcopal conference of Nigeria.

See also
 Catholic Church in Nigeria

References

Nigeria
Catholic Church in Nigeria